The Water of Leith Walkway is a public footpath and cycleway that runs alongside the small river of the same name through Edinburgh, Scotland, from Balerno to Leith. 

The concept of a public path first appeared in 1949, but the necessary construction work was not begun until after 1973. Nowadays, it provides access to many interesting sights, like the Scottish National Gallery of Modern Art and the Dean Gallery.

Walking and cycling the path 
The path starts next to Balerno High School and runs 12.25 miles (19.6 kilometres) to Leith. The path runs downhill, but the incline is so slight that it is barely perceptible. Approximately half a mile of the route is on roads; for the remainder the path runs alongside the Water of Leith, and away from traffic. The section from Balerno to Slateford utilises the dismantled Balerno railway line The path surface is a mixture of tarmac, compressed grit and compressed earth.  The surface is uniformly good with very few muddy patches or potholes. The route is well used by both pedestrians and cyclists. 

The path is fairly well signposted, but there are one or two places in Edinburgh where the path meets a road and it is necessary to hunt around for its continuation. Some signposts have been vandalised or pointed in the wrong direction. 

The path passes through the attractive Dean Village area of Edinburgh and ends in the docks at Leith. 

Walkers can return to Balerno by catching a bus to the centre of Edinburgh from Ocean Terminal, and then the 44 bus to Balerno. For cyclists the easiest way to return to Balerno is to cycle back, or use the train from central Edinburgh to Curriehill railway station.

The Water of Leith is also a good fishing spot due to the concerted effort to clean up the water. You can expect to catch wild brown trout (Salmo trutta m. fario) and grayling (Thymallus thymallus) with the odd pike (Esox lucius) lurking nearby. Grayling only swim in clean water so this is a good advertisement for the Water of Leith itself.

External links 
Map of pathway.
Places of interest along the route
Tourist attractions in Edinburgh
Leith
Footpaths in Scotland
Water of Leith
Water of Leith Millennium Bid document - successfully allowed some sections to be upgraded for 2000